This is a list of graphic novels which have won a notable award.

Pulitzer Prize winners
 1992: Maus aka. Maus: A Survivor's Tale — My Father Bleeds History by Art Spiegelman (non-fiction)

Hugo Award winners
 1988: Watchmen by Alan Moore and Dave Gibbons, category "Other Forms"
 2009: Girl Genius, Volume 8: Agatha Heterodyne and the Chapel of Bones by Kaja & Phil Foglio, art by Phil Foglio, colors by Cheyenne Wright (Airship Entertainment), Best Graphic Novel
 2010: Girl Genius, Volume 9: Agatha Heterodyne and the Heirs of the Storm by Kaja & Phil Foglio, art by Phil Foglio, colors by Cheyenne Wright (Airship Entertainment), Best Graphic Story
 2011: Girl Genius, Volume 10: Agatha Heterodyne and the Guardian Muse by Kaja & Phil Foglio, art by Phil Foglio, colors by Cheyenne Wright (Airship Entertainment), Best Graphic Story
 2012: Digger by Ursula Vernon (writer, artist) (Sofawolf Press), Best Graphic Story
 2013: Saga, Volume One by Brian K. Vaughan (writer), Fiona Staples (artist) (Image Comics), Best Graphic Story
 2015: Ms. Marvel, Volume 1: No Normal by G. Willow Wilson (writer), Adrian Alphona (artist), Jake Wyatt (artist) (Marvel Comics), Best Graphic Story
 2016: The Sandman: Overture by Neil Gaiman (writer), J. H. Williams III (artist) (Vertigo), Best Graphic Story
 2017: Monstress, Volume 1: Awakening by Marjorie Liu (writer), Sana Takeda (artist) (Image Comics), Best Graphic Story
 2018: Monstress, Volume 2: The Blood by Marjorie Liu (writer), Sana Takeda (artist) (Image Comics), Best Graphic Story
 2019: Monstress, Volume 3: Haven by Marjorie Liu (writer), Sana Takeda (artist) (Image Comics), Best Graphic Story
 2020: LaGuardia by Nnedi Okorafor (writer), Tana Ford (artist), James Devlin (colorist) (Berger Books/Dark Horse Comics), Best Graphic Story
 2021: Parable of the Sower: A Graphic Novel Adaptation by Octavia E. Butler (original author), Damian Duffy (writer), John Jennings (artist), (Abrams Books), Best Graphic Story

Bram Stoker Award winners 
 2000: The League of Extraordinary Gentlemen, Volume One by Alan Moore and Kevin O'Neill, category "Best Illustrated Narrative"
 2003: The Sandman: Endless Nights by Neil Gaiman, category "Best Illustrated Narrative"
 2011: Neonomicon by Alan Moore and Jacen Burrows, category "Best Graphic Novel" 
 2012: Witch Hunts: A Graphic History of the Burning Times by Rocky Wood and Lisa Morton, "Best Graphic Novel"
 2013: Alabaster: Wolves by Caitlin R. Kiernan, "Best Graphic Novel"
 2014: Bad Blood by Jonathan Maberry and Tyler Crook, "Best Graphic Novel"
 2015: Shadow Show: Stories in Celebration of Ray Bradbury by Sam Weller, Mort Castle, Chris Ryall, and Carlos Guzman, "Best Graphic Novel"
 2017: Kindred: A Graphic Novel Adaptation by Damian Duffy and Octavia E. Butler, "Best Graphic Novel"

Guardian First Book Award winner
2001: Jimmy Corrigan, the Smartest Kid on Earth by Chris Ware

Robert F. Kennedy Book Award
2014 Special Recognition: March: Book One by John Lewis, Andrew Aydin, & Nate Powell

The Case Centre Awards & Competitions Winners 

 2019 Outstanding Compact Case Award Winner: Turbulence on the Tarmac, by Debapratim Purkayastha and Sid Ghosh (Non-fiction; Case Ref 519-0016-1)

World Fantasy Award winner
 The Sandman: Dream Country contains a story by Neil Gaiman and Charles Vess, #19 "A Midsummer Night's Dream" that earned this award in 1991 as Best Short Fiction.

Sidewise Award winner
 2004 Ministry of Space by Warren Ellis (writer) and Chris Weston (artist) (Image Comics), Best Short Form

Ignatz Award winners
 Black Hole by Charles Burns
 Diary of a Mosquito Abatement Man by John Porcellino
 Tricked by Alex Robinson
 Persepolis 2: The Story of a Return by Marjane Satrapi
 Blankets by Craig Thompson
 Three Fingers by Rich Koslowski
 From Hell by Alan Moore and Eddie Campbell
 Cages by Dave McKean
 Ghost World by Daniel Clowes
 It's a Good Life, If You Don't Weaken by Seth
 Same Difference and Other Stories by Derek Kirk Kim

Kirby Award for Best Graphic Album winners
 Beowulf (First Comics)
 The Rocketeer, by Dave Stevens (Eclipse Comics)
 Batman: The Dark Knight Returns, by Frank Miller and Klaus Janson (DC)

Eisner Award / Harvey Award winners

Original graphic novels
 Acme Novelty Library #13, by Chris Ware
 Batman: The Killing Joke by Alan Moore and Brian Bolland
 Batman: War on Crime by Paul Dini and Alex Ross
 Batman & Superman Adventures: World's Finest by Paul Dini, Joe Staton and Terry Beatty
 Blankets by Craig Thompson
 The Cartoon History of the Universe III: From the Rise of Arabia to the Renaissance by Larry Gonick
 Ed the Happy Clown by Chester Brown
 Elektra Lives Again by Frank Miller
 Fairy Tales of Oscar Wilde Vol. 2, by Oscar Wilde and P. Craig Russell
 Fax from Sarajevo by Joe Kubert
 Fun Home by Alison Bechdel
 The Golem's Mighty Swing by James Sturm
 Last Day in Vietnam by Will Eisner
 March: Book Two by John Lewis, Andrew Aydin, & Nate Powell
 The Name of the Game by Will Eisner
 One! Hundred! Demons! by Lynda Barry 
 The Originals by Dave Gibbons
 Our Cancer Year by Harvey Pekar, Joyce Brabner and Frank Stack (non-fiction)
 Safe Area Goražde by Joe Sacco (non-fiction)
 Signal to Noise by Neil Gaiman and Dave McKean
 A Small Killing by Alan Moore and Oscar Zarate
 Stuck Rubber Baby by Howard Cruse
 Superman: Peace on Earth by Paul Dini and Alex Ross
 Swallow Me Whole by Nate Powell
 This One Summer by Mariko Tamaki and Jillian Tamaki
 To the Heart of the Storm by Will Eisner
 Torso by Brian Michael Bendis and Marc Andreyko
 Understanding Comics by Scott McCloud (non-fiction)
 Why I Hate Saturn by Kyle Baker
 You Are Here by Kyle Baker

Comic-book compilations
  Astonishing X-Men: Gifted by Joss Whedon and John Cassaday
 Astro City: Life in the Big City by Kurt Busiek and Brent Anderson
 Batman: Black and White by various creators, ed. by Bob Kahan
 Batman: Black & White, Volume Two by various creators, ed. by Mark Chiarello and Nick J. Napolitano
 Batman: Dark Victory by Jeph Loeb and Tim Sale
 Batman: The Long Halloween Jeph Loeb and Tim Sale
 Batman Adventures: Dangerous Dames and Demons by Paul Dini, Bruce Timm, and others
 Blacksad 2 by Juanjo Guarnido and Juan Diaz Canales
 The Complete Bone Adventures (1994), reissued in color as Bone: Out from Boneville (2005), by Jeff Smith
 Bone: One Volume Edition by Jeff Smith
 Cages by Dave McKean
 Cerebus: Flight by Dave Sim and Gerhard
 From Hell by Alan Moore and Eddie Campbell
 Hellboy: Seed of Destruction by Mike Mignola
 Hellboy: The Wolves of Saint August by Mike Mignola
 Jimmy Corrigan, the Smartest Kid on Earth by Chris Ware
 Kings in Disguise by James Vance and Dan Burr.
 Lone Wolf and Cub by Kazuo Koike and Goseki Kojima
 Louis Riel by Chester Brown
 Marvels by Kurt Busiek and Alex Ross
 Maus II a.k.a. Maus: A Survivor's Tale — And Here My Troubles Began by Art Spiegelman (non-fiction)
 Same Difference and Other Stories by Derek Kirk Kim
 Sandman: The Doll's House by Neil Gaiman and various artists
 Sin City a.k.a. Sin City: The Hard Goodbye by Frank Miller
 Sin City: Family Values by Frank Miller
 Sin City: That Yellow Bastard by Frank Miller
 Stray Bullets: Innocence of Nihilism by David Lapham
 The Tale of One Bad Rat by Bryan Talbot
 Twentieth Century Eightball by Daniel Clowes
 Watchmen by Alan Moore and Dave Gibbons
 Y: The Last Man by Brian K. Vaughan

Kodansha Manga Award
1984: Akira by Katsuhiro Otomo
1986: Adolf by Osamu Tezuka and What's Michael? by Makoto Kobayashi (tie)
1993: Parasyte by Hitoshi Iwaaki
2000: Vagabond by Takehiko Inoue
2001: 20th Century Boys by Naoki Urasawa
2006: Mushishi by Yuki Urushibara
2009: Ah! My Goddess by Kōsuke Fujishima
2012: Vinland Saga by Makoto Yukimura
2015: Knights of Sidonia by Tsutomu Nihei

Kirkus Prize 

 2019 Winner: New Kid by Jerry Craft

National Book Award

Young People's Literature 
 2006 Finalist: American Born Chinese by Gene Luen Yang
 2009 Finalist: Stitches by David Small
 2013 Finalist: Boxers and Saints by Gene Luen Yang
 2015 Finalist: Nimona by ND Stevenson
 2016 Winner: March: Book Three by John Lewis, Andrew Aydin, & Nate Powell

American Library Association Youth Media Awards

Newbery Medal 
 2015 Honor Book: El Deafo by Cece Bell
 2016 Honor Book: Roller Girl by Victoria Jamieson
 2020 Winner: New Kid by Jerry Craft

Caldecott Medal 
 2015 Honor Book: This One Summer by Mariko Tamaki and Jillian Tamaki

Coretta Scott King Book Award 
 2014 Author Honor: March: Book One by John Lewis, Andrew Aydin, & Nate Powell
 2017 Author Winner: March: Book Three by John Lewis, Andrew Aydin, & Nate Powell
 2020 Author Winner: New Kid by Jerry Craft

Michael L. Printz Award
 2007 Winner: American Born Chinese by Gene Luen Yang
 2015 Honor Book: This One Summer by Mariko Tamaki and Jillian Tamaki
 2017 Winner: March: Book Three by John Lewis, Andrew Aydin, & Nate Powell

Robert F. Sibert Informational Book Medal
 2017 Winner: March: Book Three by John Lewis, Andrew Aydin, & Nate Powell

YALSA Nonfiction Award
 2017 Winner: March: Book Three by John Lewis, Andrew Aydin, & Nate Powell

See also
List of graphic novels: Adapted into TV/film
Doug Wright Awards

References

List of award-winning graphic novels
 
Graphic novels
Graphic novels
Manga awards